The UCI Track Cycling World Cup – Women's points race are the World Cup points race for women races held at the UCI Track Cycling World Cup.

Medalists

1995

1996

1997

1998

1999

2000

2001

2002

2003

2004

2004–2005

2005–2006

2006–2007

2007–2008

2008–2009

2009–2010

2010–2011

2011–2012

2012–2013

2013–2014

See also
 UCI Track Cycling World Cup – Women's individual pursuit
 UCI Track Cycling World Cup – Women's team pursuit
 UCI Track Cycling World Championships – Women's points race

References

 
UCI Track Cycling World Cup